Sin Piedad (2003) (Spanish for "No Mercy") was an annual professional wrestling major event produced by Consejo Mundial de Lucha Libre (CMLL), which took place on December 5, 2003 in Arena México, Mexico City, Mexico and replaced CMLL's regular Friday night show Super Viernes ("Super Friday"). The 2003 Sin Piedad was the fourth event under that name that CMLL promoted as their last major show of the year, always held in December. In the main event Universo 2000 risked his mask and Pierroth, Jr. risked his hair on the outcome of their Lucha de Apuestas (bet match). The undercard featured an additional Luchas de Apuestas match where both Ángel Azteca and Arkangel de la Muerte put their mask on the line, guaranteeing that one of them would be forced to unmask after the match. The show featured three additional matches including the tournament finals of a tournament for the vacant Mexican National Trios Championship. The event featured five professional wrestling matches with different wrestlers involved in pre-existing scripted feuds or storylines. Wrestlers portray either villains (referred to as "rudos" in Mexico) or fan favorites ("technicos" in Mexico) as they follow a series of tension-building events, which culminate in a wrestling match or series of matches.

Production

Background
The Mexican wrestling company Consejo Mundial de Lucha Libre (Spanish for "World Wrestling Council"; CMLL) has held a number of major shows over the years using the moniker Sin Piedad ("No Pity" or "No Mercy"). CMLL has intermittently held a show billed specifically as Sin Piedad since 2000, primarily using the name for their "end of the year" show in December, although once they held a Sin Piedad show in August as well. CMLL has on occasion used a different name for the end-of-year show but Sin Piedad is the most commonly used name. All Sin Piedad shows have been held in Arena México in Mexico City, Mexico which is CMLL's main venue, its "home". Traditionally CMLL holds their major events on Friday Nights, which means the Sin Piedad shows replace their regularly scheduled Super Viernes show. The 2003 Sin Piedad show was the fourth show to use the name.

Storylines
The event featured five professional wrestling matches with different wrestlers involved in pre-existing scripted feuds, plots and storylines. Wrestlers were portrayed as either heels (referred to as rudos in Mexico, those that portray the "bad guys") or faces (técnicos in Mexico, the "good guy" characters) as they followed a series of tension-building events, which culminated in a wrestling match or series of matches.

Results

References

2003 in professional wrestling
CMLL Sin Piedad
December 2003 events in Mexico